Lisa Raymond and Rennae Stubbs were the defending champions but they competed with different partners that year, Raymond with Lindsay Davenport and Stubbs with Jelena Dokić.

Dokić and Stubbs lost in the quarterfinals to Stéphanie Foretz and Antonella Serra Zanetti.

Davenport and Raymond won in the final 6–3, 6–2 against Jennifer Capriati and Magüi Serna.

Seeds
Champion seeds are indicated in bold text while text in italics indicates the round in which those seeds were eliminated.

 Elena Likhovtseva /  Ai Sugiyama (quarterfinals)
 Lindsay Davenport /  Lisa Raymond (champions)
 Jelena Dokić /  Rennae Stubbs (quarterfinals)
 Daniela Hantuchová /  Chanda Rubin (semifinals)

Draw

External links
2003 Hastings Direct International Championships Doubles draw

Doubles
Hastings Direct International Championships